GSFC University is located in Vadodara, Gujarat, India. It was established in 2015 by Gujarat State Fertilizers and Chemicals Limited.

They appointed Dr Nikhil Zaveri as its provost during August 2019.

References

External links

Private universities in India
Universities in Gujarat
Universities and colleges in Vadodara
Educational institutions established in 2015
2015 establishments in Gujarat